Barfly is the second album from Buck-O-Nine, originally released in 1995 on Taang! Records. The album contains several cover songs that influenced the band's individual members. The cover songs were narrowed down from a list of seven possible cover songs the band had rehearsed and performed live, having originally been picked round-robin style. The album is fleshed out with original songs written after the release of Songs in the Key of Bree. Barfly was released shortly after Songs in the Key of Bree, in part because the band was anxious to have a release available that would see wider distribution than the first album was gaining.

Track listing
"Callin' in Sick"
"On a Mission"
"Pass the Dutchie" (Musical Youth cover)
"Teenagers from Mars" (The Misfits cover)
"Water in My Head"
"Wrong 'Em Boyo" (The Clash cover)
"Away"
"Full Metal Bree"
"Junior"
"Still Remains"
"Sound System" (Operation Ivy cover)
"Barfly"
"Bonus Track"

Credits

Performance
Jon Pebsworth - Vocals
Jonas Kleiner - Guitar
Dan Albert - Trombone
Anthony Curry - Trumpet
Craig Yarnold - Alto Sax
Scott Kennerly - Bass
Steve Bauer - Drums

Production
Engineered and mixed by Jeff Forest at DoubleTime Studios, San Diego, California

References

1995 albums
Buck-O-Nine albums
Taang! Records albums